Choi Sang-sun (born 13 February 1972) is a South Korean wrestler. He competed at the 1996 Summer Olympics and the 2000 Summer Olympics. He also won the gold medal at the Asian Games in 1994 and 1998.

References

External links
 

1972 births
Living people
South Korean male sport wrestlers
Olympic wrestlers of South Korea
Wrestlers at the 1996 Summer Olympics
Wrestlers at the 2000 Summer Olympics
Place of birth missing (living people)
Asian Games medalists in wrestling
Wrestlers at the 1994 Asian Games
Wrestlers at the 1998 Asian Games
Asian Games gold medalists for South Korea
Medalists at the 1994 Asian Games
Medalists at the 1998 Asian Games
20th-century South Korean people
21st-century South Korean people